Sergey Petrovich Botkin (5 September 1832 – 12 December 1889) was a famous Russian clinician, therapist, and activist, one of the founders of modern Russian medical science and education. He introduced triage, pathological anatomy, and post mortem diagnostics into Russian medical practice.

Life and career
Botkin was born on 5 September 1832, in Moscow to a family of famous Russian tea tradesmen, and the son of Anna Ivanovna (Postnikova) and Petr Kononovich Botkin. He made his first steps towards education in the private school of Ennes. In 1850 Botkin was admitted to Moscow State University. In 1855 Sergey Botkin graduated from the university with honors and received a Doctor of Medicine degree. Shortly afterwards however he was mobilized as a conscript, designated to serve as military surgeon and sent straight to Sevastopol, where the Crimean War was in full swing. There Botkin worked under the guidance of Nikolay Pirogov, widely recognized as a pioneer of field surgery (i.e. the treatment of wounded combatants on the spot and in spite of ongoing hostilities as the situation may warrant). Pirogov is known for performing the first operation under anesthesia on the battlefield at the time. Upon the end of his military service, Botkin received a flattering review from his supervisor. 
He subsequently went abroad, seeking to improve his skills and was able to gain valuable professional experience working at some of the most prestigious institutions on the continent. Upon his return to Russia, Botkin was invited to work with professor Shipulinsky in the Academy of Medicine and Surgery, and the following year Botkin took Shipulinsky’s position at the age of 29.

In 1860–1861, Sergey Botkin opened a clinical and research laboratory and in the course of his research organized systematic studies in clinical pharmacology and experimental therapy, both novelties in Russian research at the time. He was the first to suggest that catarrhal jaundice (hepatitis) was caused by an infection. In early 1860s, Botkin was assigned as an advising member of the medical board of the Imperial Ministry of Internal Affairs. In 1873 he was also made Head Surgeon to the Emperor, having been among the court physicians for both Tsar Alexander II and Tsar Alexander III. Furthermore, the same year he was elected president of the Medical Association of St. Petersburg. In 1886, Botkin headed the National Public Health Commission, created to investigate the unusually high mortality rates prevalent in Russia, both in times of peace and war. Botkin Hospital is named after him.

Family

Botkin was married to A.A. Krylova, relative of Alexey Krylov. His brother Vasily was a prominent writer and his brother Mikhail was a painter and well-known art collector. His son, Dr. Eugene Botkin, was murdered with Nicholas II and the Tsar's family July 16/17, 1918 by the Bolsheviks.

Sergey Petrovich Botkin died on 12 December 1889, in Menton, France, from  liver disease, which was complicated by a heart ailment.

Bibliography

References

External links

Bio 
Biography 
Biography Encyclopedia  

1832 births
1889 deaths
Physicians from Moscow
People from Moskovsky Uyezd
Privy Councillor (Russian Empire)
Physicians from the Russian Empire
Imperial Moscow University alumni
Emigrants from the Russian Empire to France
Recipients of the Order of the White Eagle (Russia)
Recipients of the Order of St. Vladimir, 2nd class
Recipients of the Order of St. Anna, 1st class
Recipients of the Order of Saint Stanislaus (Russian), 2nd class